Yōma or Youma may refer to:

 Yōma (洋間), a Japanese architectural term for a room in Western style; see Washitsu
 Yōma (妖魔), one of several Japanese words for monster; see Yaoguai
 Youma (town) (油麻镇), in Guiping, Guangxi, China
 Youma Diakite (born 1971), Malian model and television personality

See also
 Yoma (disambiguation)